Jejuia pallidilutea is a Gram-negative and aerobic bacterium from the genus of Jejuia which has been isolated from seawater from the coast of Jeju Island.

References 

Flavobacteria
Bacteria described in 2009